Kristen Ryley Sy Bugay (born January 23, 1996), known as Ryley Bugay, is a footballer who plays as a midfielder. Born in the United States, she represents the Philippines women's national team.

Early life and education
Ryley Bugay was born on 23 January 1996 in West Lafayette, Indiana, U.S. to Dave and Terri Bugay and has three siblings. She attended William Henry Harrison High School and entered 
to pursue a major degree in biomedical sciences.

Career

High school
At William Henry Harrison High School, Bugay played for her school's women's soccer team and lettered in soccer for four times. In her sophomore season, she helped William Henry Harrison to the sectional championship and was named to the HCC All-Conference Team and the all-district second team. For her junior season, she was named high school MVP, received an all-state honorable mention, and was named into the all-district first team. She was the captain of the women's soccer team during her senior season.

College
Bugay plays for the Marquette Golden Eagles women's soccer team as a redshirt athlete. She started her collegiate career in 2015, a year after her first year in Marquette University as an academic freshman. In the 2017 season, now a redshirt junior, Bugay played a team-high of 1,871 minutes and started in all 21 matches as a holding midfielder. She is considered as a key player for Marquette and earned the nickname "Ry Boo Boo Glue" from her coach due to how she keeps the college team "together".

International
Following her 2017 season with Marquette, Bugay was invited to participate in an initial identification camp organized by the Philippines women's national football team in November 2017. She made into the final-23 player roster for the 2018 AFC Women's Asian Cup. She plays as a defender for the national team.

Honours

International

Philippines
Southeast Asian Games third place: 2021
AFF Women's Championship: 2022

References

External links
Ryley Bugay at Fupa.net 

1996 births
Living people
Citizens of the Philippines through descent
Filipino women's footballers
Women's association football defenders
Women's association football midfielders
Philippines women's international footballers
1. FC Saarbrücken (women) players
2. Frauen-Bundesliga players
Filipino expatriate footballers
Filipino expatriate sportspeople in Germany
People from West Lafayette, Indiana
Soccer players from Indiana
American women's soccer players
Marquette Golden Eagles women's soccer players
F.C. Indiana players
American expatriate women's soccer players
American expatriate soccer players in Germany
American sportspeople of Filipino descent
Southeast Asian Games bronze medalists for the Philippines
Southeast Asian Games medalists in football
Competitors at the 2021 Southeast Asian Games